is a neighborhood in Toshima, Tokyo, Japan. It lies at the crossing point of the JR Yamanote Line and National Route 17.

Available public transportation to Sugamo are JR Yamanote Line and Toei Mita Line. There is also Koshinzuka station of Toden Arakawa Line in the middle of  shopping street. 

Tokugawa Yoshinobu, who is the last shogun of the Tokugawa Shogunate set his residence here in 1897.  He has lived for 4 years there and moved away to avoid the noise coming from Yamanote Line.

Education
Public elementary and junior high schools are operated by the Toshima Ward Board of Education.

Sugamo is served by the attendance zones of multiple elementary schools:
 Gyoko Elementary School (仰高小学校) - 2-chome, most of 1-chome and 3-chome
 Sugamo Elementary School (巣鴨小学校) - 1-chome 34-49-ban
 Seiwa Elementary School (清和小学校) - 3-chome 5-18 ban, 4-chome 1-26 and 33-ban and most of 28, 29, and 32-ban
 Asahi Elementary School (朝日小学校) - 5-chome, and 4-chome 27, 30-31, and 34-44-ban, and parts of 28, 29, and 32-ban

The following junior high schools serve portions of Sugamo:
 Komagome (駒込中学校) - 2-chome, most of 1-chome and 3-chome
 Sugamo North (Sugamo Kita) (巣鴨北中学校) - All of 4 and 5-chome, and 3-chome 5-18-ban
 West Sugamo (Nishi Sugamo) (西巣鴨中学校) - 1-chome 34-49-ban

See also
 Sugamo Prison
 Sugamo Station
 Tokugawa Yoshinobu

References 

Neighborhoods of Tokyo
Districts of Toshima

de:Sugamo